Fiorano Modenese is a comune (municipality) in the province of Modena in the Italian region Emilia-Romagna, located about  west of Bologna and about  southwest of Modena. Neighboring municipalities are Formigine, Sassuolo, Serramazzoni, Maranello.

Ferrari's private testing track, the Fiorano Circuit is located on the border with Maranello.

Main sights

Castle of Spezzano, noted from 11th century. It includes a frescoed gallery with scenes of battles fought by duke Alfonso I d'Este (1527-1531). At the lower floor is a hall with mid-16th century landscapes commissioned by Marco III Pio. A pentagonal tower once housed a prison and is now housed as a communal vinegar store.
Sanctuary of the Beata Vergine del Castello di Fiorano
Parish church of San Giovanni Battista
Oratorio di San Rocco, Spezzano
Museum of Ceramic
Church of San Lorenzo, Nirano 
Salse of Nirano
Theater Astoria
Villas: Villa Campori, Villa Pace, Villa Guastalla, Villa Coccapani, Villa Cuoghi, Villa Messori.
Municipal vinegar factory

Districts

The municipality of Fiorano Modenese is divided on 4 districts: Fiorano Modenese, Spezzano, Ubersetto and Nirano.

Twin towns 
 Nardò, Italy
 San Donato di Ninea, Italy
 Ozieri, Italy
 Burgos, Italy
 Bultei, Italy
 Onda, Spain

References

External links
 Official website

Cities and towns in Emilia-Romagna